The Church of Jesus Christ of Latter-day Saints in Connecticut refers to the Church of Jesus Christ of Latter-day Saints (LDS Church) and its members in Connecticut.  As of 2021, the LDS Church reported 15,625 members in 37 congregations.

Official church membership as a percentage of general population was 0.43% in 2014. TAccording to the 2014 Pew Forum on Religion & Public Life survey, roughly 1% of Connecticuters self-identify themselves most closely with the LDS Church. The LDS Church is the 10th largest denomination in Connecticut.

History

The first missionaries arrived in the state in Salisbury in 1832, only two years after the church was founded by Joseph Smith.

In 2010, an estimated 40,000 people—over the course of its month-long open house—visited the new Hartford Connecticut Temple.

Stakes and congregations

As of February 2023, the following congregations, by stake, are in Connecticut:

Fairfield Connecticut Stake
Bridgeport 1st Ward
Bridgeport 2nd Ward (Spanish)
Darien Ward
New Canaan Ward
Stamford Ward
Trumbull Ward
Wilton Ward

Hartford Connecticut Stake
Avon Ward
Bloomfield Ward
Canton Ward
Glastonbury Ward
Goshen Ward
Hartford 1st Ward
Hartford 2nd Branch (Spanish)
Manchester Ward
South Windsor Ward

New Haven Connecticut Stake
New Haven Ward
Newtown Ward
Southbury Ward
Southington Ward
Waterbury 1st Ward
Waterbury 2nd Branch (Spanish)
Woodbridge 1st Ward
Woodbridge 2nd Branch (Spanish)
Danbury Branch (Spanish)
New Haven YSA Branch

New London Connecticut Stake
Ashford Ward
Cromwell Ward
Groton Ward
Madison Ward
Norwich Ward
Waterford Ward
Westerly Branch

Springfield Massachusetts Stake
Ellington Ward

Missions
The following table lists missions that have served Connecticut and the dates they were organized or consolidated:

 The Eastern States Mission was discontinued in April 1850.  It was reopened in January 1893.  Little missionary work was done between 1850 and 1893.
 On June 20, 1974, the name of the New England Mission was changed to the Massachusetts Boston Mission. No new mission was created.
 The Connecticut Hartford Mission was consolidated into the Massachusetts Boston Mission on July 1, 2011.

Temples

On October 2, 2010 the Hartford Connecticut Temple was announced by church president Thomas S. Monson. He later broke ground for the temple in August 2013. The temple was later dedicated in November 2016 following a public open house.

References

External links

 Newsroom (Connecticut)
 ComeUntoChrist.org Latter-day Saints Visitor site
 The Church of Jesus Christ of Latter-day Saints Official site

Christianity in Connecticut
Latter Day Saint movement in Connecticut
Connecticut